Hit the Ground is a single by American rock band Hinder from their album When the Smoke Clears. It was released on November 24, 2014 on The End Records. The song debuted on the Active Rock Charts at #34.

Charts

References

2015 songs
Hinder songs
Songs written by Cody Hanson
Songs written by Marshal Dutton
Songs written by Matt McGinn (songwriter)
Songs written by Corey Crowder (songwriter)